The Hunger Strike Medal was a silver medal awarded between August 1909 and 1914 to suffragette prisoners by the leadership of the Women's Social and Political Union (WSPU). During their imprisonment, they went on hunger strike while serving their sentences in the prisons of the United Kingdom for acts of militancy in their campaign for women's suffrage. Many women were force-fed and their individual medals were created to reflect this.

The WSPU awarded a range of military-style campaign medals to raise morale and encourage continued loyalty and commitment to the cause. The Hunger Strike Medals were designed by Sylvia Pankhurst and first presented by leadership of the WSPU at a ceremony in early August 1909 to women who had gone on hunger strike while serving a prison sentence. Later the medals would be presented at a breakfast reception on a woman's release from prison.

Background 
On 5 July 1909, suffragette Marion Wallace Dunlop began her hunger strike in Holloway Prison. She had been sentenced to one month for stenciling a message from the Bill of Rights on the wall of the House of Commons. The prison authorities considered her a criminal prisoner whereas she viewed herself as a political prisoner and began her strike in objection to this classification. Her strike lasted 91 hours, ending only because the prison released her to avoid her death.

Although the hunger strike was Wallace Dunlop's idea and she did it without informing the leadership of the WSPU, many others quickly imitated her.

Medal description 
The round and hallmarked silver medals hang on a length of ribbon in the purple, white and green colours of the WSPU. This hangs from a silver pin bar engraved with 'For Valour', in imitation of the inscription found on the Victoria Cross. The front of the medal is inscribed 'Hunger Strike', while the reverse is engraved the recipient's name surrounded by a laurel wreath. The medals were made by Toye & Co. and their manufacture cost the WSPU £1.00 each.

The silver bars on the medal were awarded for periods of hunger strike and are engraved on the reverse with the date that the recipient was arrested leading to a hunger strike. The enamelled purple, white and green bars for force-feeding are similarly engraved on the reverse.

The sculptor Edith Downing's medal bar is engraved with 'Fed by Force 1/3/12' - the date that she was imprisoned which subsequently lead to her hunger strike and forcible feeding. The medals could be issued with more than one bar representing multiple hunger strikes or force-feeding.

Presentation 
Each Hunger Strike Medal was presented in a purple box with a green velvet lining. A piece of white silk was fitted inside the lid which was printed in gold with the dedication: 'Presented to [name] by the Women's Social and Political Union in recognition of a gallant action, whereby through endurance to the last extremity of hunger and hardship a great principle of political justice was vindicated'.

Surviving medals 

The Museum of London holds the medal awarded to the suffragette leader Mrs Emmeline Pankhurst who went on hunger strike during a two-month prison sentence in 1912 for throwing a stone at a window of 10 Downing Street.

Helen MacRae's Hunger Strike Medal in its case was auctioned in 2015 to a private collector, for £12,300, Lockdales Auctioneer's  auction manager, James Sadler said 'These are among the most historically important items we have ever dealt with.' 

A medal found in a drawer awarded to suffragette Elsie Wolff Van Sandau who was arrested for smashing a window in Covent Garden on 4 March 1912 and who went on hunger strike in prison was sold at auction in 2019 for £12,500. A medal belonging to suffragette Selina Martin, auctioned in Nottingham  in 2019, expected to fetch £15,000-£20,000 was bought by the National Gallery of Victoria, Australia for £27,000.

The Museum of New Zealand Te Papa Tongarewa purchased Frances Parker's medal in 2016.

The Museum of Australian Democracy holds the medal awarded to Charlotte Blacklock. The medal awarded to Kate Williams Evans was sold at auction as part of a collection in 2018 which realised £48,640. It is now in the National Museum Wales.

Rosamund Massy's medal and Holloway brooch are buried inside the plinth of the statue of Emmeline Pankhurst in London.

In popular culture 
The BBC television series Call the Midwife, featured an episode with an elderly suffragette played by Annette Crosbie who gifted her Hunger Strike Medal to one the nurses who cared for her.

Medal recipients

If known, this list also contains the dates of their arrest as inscribed on their medals.

Likely medal recipients 
These women are WSPU hunger strikers who therefore meet the conditions to have been awarded a medal but the evidence of their medal has yet to be located.

NB This does not appear to a full list of the hunger strikers. For example, in January 2022 this Wikipedia page had 9 names with surname beginning P and the  Home Office List has 13

See also
Holloway brooch
Suffrage jewellery
The Suffragette Handkerchief

References

Awards established in 1909
First-wave feminism
Social history of the United Kingdom
Women's Social and Political Union
Women's suffrage in the United Kingdom
Feminism and the arts
Hunger strikes
1909 establishments in the United Kingdom
Medals